"We Don't Have to Do This" is a song written by Gary Burr and Victoria Shaw, and recorded by American country music artist Tanya Tucker.  It was released in January 1994 as the second single from her album Soon.  The song reached number 11 on the Billboard Hot Country Singles & Tracks chart in April 1994.

Chart performance

References

1994 singles
1993 songs
Tanya Tucker songs
Liberty Records singles
Songs written by Gary Burr
Songs written by Victoria Shaw (singer)
Song recordings produced by Jerry Crutchfield